List of champions of the 1900 U.S. National Championships tennis tournament (now known as the US Open). The men's tournament was held from 13 August to 21 August on the outdoor grass courts at the Newport Casino in Newport, Rhode Island. The women's tournament was held from 19 June to 23 June on the outdoor grass courts at the Philadelphia Cricket Club in Philadelphia, Pennsylvania. It was the 20th U.S. National Championships and the second Grand Slam tournament of the year.

Finals

Men's singles

 Malcolm Whitman defeated  William Larned  6–4, 1–6, 6–2, 6–2

Women's singles

 Myrtle McAteer defeated  Edith Parker  6–2, 6–2, 6–0

Men's doubles
 Holcombe Ward /  Dwight Davis defeated  Fred Alexander /  Raymond Little 6–4, 9–7, 12–10

Women's doubles
 Hallie Champlin /  Edith Parker defeated  Marie Wimer /  Myrtle McAteer 9–7, 6–2, 6–2

Mixed doubles
 Margaret Hunnewell /  Alfred Codman defeated  T. Shaw /  George Atkinson 11–9, 6–3, 6–1

References

External links
Official US Open website

 
U.S. National Championships
U.S. National Championships (tennis) by year
National Championships
U.S. National Championships (tennis)
U.S. National Championships (tennis)
U.S. National Championships (tennis)
U.S. National Championships (tennis)